Carcajou Lake is located in Glacier National Park, in the U. S. state of Montana. The lake is on the north slope of Porcupine Ridge.

The word carcajou is Canadian French for "wolverine".

See also
List of lakes in Glacier County, Montana

References

Lakes of Glacier National Park (U.S.)
Lakes of Glacier County, Montana